The 1921 Kansas Jayhawks football team represented the University of Kansas as a member of the Missouri Valley Conference (MVC) during the 1921 college football season. In their first season under head coach Potsy Clark, the Jayhawks compiled an overall record of 4–3 record with a mark of 3–3 against conference opponents, finished in fifth place in the MVC, and were outscored by opponents by a combined total of 97 to 92. Kansas played its first home game of the season, against Drake in October 15, then moved to the newly-opened Memorial Stadium in Lawrence, Kansas for the rest of the season. Paul Jones was the team captain.

Schedule

References

Kansas
Kansas Jayhawks football seasons
Kansas Jayhawks football